Oscar Halls (born 15 November 2004) is an English professional footballer who plays as a defender for  club Plymouth Argyle.

Career
Halls signed a professional contract with Plymouth Argyle on his seventeenth birthday, having been with the club since being in the under-10s and travelling to training from his hometown of Penzance three times a week. He attended Mounts Bay Academy. He made his first-team debut on 30 August 2022, playing the full 90 minutes of a 1–1 draw with Bristol Rovers at Home Park in a group stage match in the EFL Trophy. He scored his first senior goal on 20 September, scoring a headed goal in a 3–1 victory at Swindon Town.

Career statistics

References

2004 births
Living people
People from Penzance
English footballers
Association football defenders
Plymouth Argyle F.C. players
English Football League players